This is a list of the 81 members of the European Parliament for Italy during the 1989 to 1994 session.

List

References

1989
List
Italy